Dindica olivacea is a moth of the family Geometridae first described by Hiroshi Inoue in 1990. It is found in the north-eastern Himalayas, south-eastern Asia, as well as on Borneo, Sumatra and the Philippines. The habitat consists of lowland forests.

References

Moths described in 1990
Pseudoterpnini